The following list of urban transit advocacy organisations indicates citizen-based interest groups which focus on urban transit service in their respective cities.

Canada
 Montreal: Transport 2000
 Toronto:  TTCriders
Toronto: CodeRedTO
 Vancouver: Bus Riders Union
 Winnipeg: Functional Transit Winnipeg
Winnipeg: TRU Winnipeg [Defunct]

New Zealand
 Auckland: Campaign for Better Transport

United States
 Atlanta: Citizens for Progressive Transit
 Atlanta: MARTA Army
 Boston: T Rider's Union
 Boston: TransitMatters
 Buffalo: Citizens Regional Transit Corporation
 Cincinnati: Better Bus Coalition
 Cleveland: Clevelanders for Public Transit
 Colorado Springs: Be United Servants
 Columbus, Ohio: Transit Columbus
 Detroit: Motor City Freedom Riders
 Houston: LINK Houston
Iowa City: Community Transportation Committee
 Los Angeles: Bus Riders Union
 Massachusetts: Transportation for Massachusetts
 Miami: Transit Alliance Miami
 Miami: Miami Riders Alliance
 Milwaukee: Transit Riders Union
 New Orleans: Ride New Orleans (formerly Transport for NOLA)
 New York City: Riders Alliance
 New York City: TransitCenter
 New York City: Straphangers Campaign
 New York City: Transportation Alternatives
 New York City: Tri-State Transportation Campaign
 New York metropolitan area: Empire State Transportation Alliance
 Orlando: Central Floridians for Public Transit
Philadelphia, Pennsylvania: Transit Forward Philadelphia, Philly Transit Riders Union, 5th Square 
 Pittsburgh, Pennsylvania: Pittsburghers for Public Transit
Providence, Rhode Island: RI Transit Riders
 San Diego, California: Circulate San Diego
 San Francisco: San Francisco Transit Riders
 Seattle: Transportation Choices Coalition
 Seattle: Transit Riders Union
 Utah: Utah Transit Riders Union
 Washington, DC: WMATA Riders' Union (defunct)
 Wisconsin: 1000 Friends of Wisconsin

United Kingdom
Campaign for Better Transport (United Kingdom)
Light Rail Transit Association

See also
 Transit watchdog

Advocacy groups
Public transport
Transport organizations